Leanne Rowat is a politician in Manitoba, Canada.  In 2003, she was elected to the Manitoba legislature as a Progressive Conservative.

Prior to entering public life herself, Rowat was a constituency assistant to Progressive Conservative MLA Harold Gilleshammer, and worked as a community development officer in the Souris region.  She also served on the board of directors of the South West Regional Health Authority, and was a Public Relations Chair for the Manitoba Winter Games 2006 Bid Committee.

When Gilleshammer retired as MLA for Minnedosa in 2003, Rowat won the Progressive Conservative nomination to replace him.  The riding is mostly rural, and is located in the province's southwestern corner.  In the 2003 election, the governing New Democratic Party made the riding its top rural target.  Rowat defeated NDP candidate Harvey Paterson, but by a margin of only twelve votes (as confirmed on recount).  She has served as opposition critics in several areas: Culture, Heritage & Tourism; Aboriginal & Northern Affairs; Multiculturalism; and Communities Economic Development Fund. She is also a supporter of grandparents' rights.

Rowat was re-elected in the 2007 provincial election.  Prior to the 2011 provincial election, the Minnedosa riding was redistributed and dissolved.  Rowat ran for election in the new riding of Riding Mountain and won the seat in 2011.

Electoral history

References

Progressive Conservative Party of Manitoba MLAs
Women MLAs in Manitoba
Living people
People from Souris, Manitoba
21st-century Canadian politicians
21st-century Canadian women politicians
Year of birth missing (living people)